The 2017–18 Club Atlético Boca Juniors season is the 89th consecutive Primera División season for the senior squad. During the season, Boca Juniors will take part in the Primera División, Copa Argentina, Supercopa Argentina and in the Group Stage of the Copa Libertadores.

Season overview

June
Ramiro Martínez is transferred to Godoy Cruz.

July
Fernando Evangelista, Leandro Marín, Nicolás Colazo, Gonzalo Castellani, Franco Cristaldo, Adrián Cubas, Alexis Messidoro, Tomás Pochettino, Nicolás Benegas, Agustín Bouzat and Andrés Chávez returned from their loans. Axel Werner, Fernando Tobio, Jonathan Silva and Ricardo Centurión returned to their clubs after a loan spell in Boca. In the first days of July Paolo Goltz arrived to the club, Gonzalo Castellani, Adrián Cubas,
Franco Cristaldo and Tomás Pochettino are loaned to Defensa y Justicia and Leandro Marín is transferred to FC Lausanne-Sport. Edwin Cardona arrives on a one-year loan from Monterrey and Cristian Espinoza arrives on an 18-month loan from Villarreal. Nicolás Colazo is loaned to Gimnasia y Esgrima (LP). The first friendly is a 1–1 draw against Nacional, Boca won 3–1 in penalties.

August
The second friendly is a 1–0 victory over Villarreal. In mutual agreement, Boca purchases the rights of Ramón Ábila from Cruzeiro and is loaned to Huracán, also, in the operation, Alexis Messidoro is loaned to Cruzeiro. In Salta, Boca won 4–2 in penalties after a 1–1 draw against Banfield. On August 12, Nicolás Benegas is loaned to San Martín (T). The first official match of the season is a 5–0 win against Gimnasia y Tiro in the Round of 64 of Copa Argentina, with a brace of Benedetto, and a great debut of Cardona. Andrés Chávez is transferred to Panathinaikos. On August 24, Boca and Peñarol reached an agreement for the transfer of midfielder Nahitan Nández. Marcelo Torres is loaned to Talleres (C). Fernando Zuqui is transferred to Estudiantes (LP). In the first game of the tournament Boca defeated Olimpo 3–0.

September
On September 2, Boca won 1-0 a friendly Superclásico over River Plate in San Juan. Nazareno Solis is loaned to Huracán. The second game of the tournament was a 1–0 victory over Lanús. Boca advanced in the Copa Argentina after defeating 1-0 Guillermo Brown in the Round of 32. On September 18 Boca won 4–1 over Godoy Cruz Antonio Tomba, followed by a 4–0 victory over Vélez Sarsfield. After 12 games without losing, Boca was defeated by Rosario Central and was eliminated of the 2016–17 Copa Argentina.

October
Boca won a tough match against Chacarita Juniors on the first match of October. Boca won the match against Patronato and against Belgrano, and set a team record with seven wins from the first seven matches in the league.

November
In the Superclásico, Boca won 2–1 over River Plate, winning eight games in a row. Boca finally lost 2–1 against Racing Club, Darío Benedetto suffered a knee injured and is out for six months. The second defeat came after a 1–0 loss against Rosario Central.

December
Boca returned to the victory after a 2-0 winning over Arsenal. In the last match of the year Boca won 1–0 over Estudiantes (LP) staying on the top in the entire 2017. On December 20 Boca were drawn into Group H of the 2018 Copa Libertadores with Brazilian team Palmeiras, Peruvian champions Alianza Lima and a team from the Qualifying Stages. Ramón Ábila returned from his loan on Huracán. On December 27, right back Julio Buffarini arrives to the club. Agustín Bouzat is transferred to Vélez Sarsfield.

January
Left back Emmanuel Mas signed a three-year contract with the club. After a controversial departure and hard talks, Carlos Tevez has returned to Boca. Nahuel Molina Lucero is loaned to Defensa y Justicia. Boca and Fernando Evangelista agreed to mutually terminate the defender's contract, Evangelista subsequently joined Newell's Old Boys. Playmaker Emanuel Reynoso arrived to the club from Talleres (C) for $1.500.000 and the loan of Alexis Messidoro and percentages of other players. On the kickoff return of the Argentine League, Boca won 2–0 over Colón. Boca and Gonzalo Castellani agreed to mutually terminate the midfielder's contract, Castellani subsequently joined Atlético Nacional. Boca and Juan Manuel Insaurralde agreed to mutually terminate the defender's contract, Insaurralde subsequently joined Colo-Colo.

February
Gino Peruzzi is loaned to Nacional. On February 4, Boca was held by San Lorenzo to a 1–1 draw. On February 11, Boca got a hard 1–0 win against Temperley, and other 1–0 against Banfield to keep leading the tournament. On February 25, Boca won 4–2 over San Martín (SJ).

March
Boca drew 0–0 against Alianza Lima in the first game of 2018 Copa Libertadores. On March 5, Boca played the worst match of the tournament and lost 2–0 against Argentinos Juniors. On March 10, on a very emotional game, Boca won 2–1 at home against Tigre. In the 2017 Supercopa Argentina Boca lost the Superclásico 2–0 against eternal rival River Plate. Continuing the tournament, Boca drew 1–1 against Atlético Tucumán.

April
The first match of April was an agonic 2–1 win against Talleres (C). The second match of the group stage of Copa Libertadores was a 1–0 victory over Colombian Junior. On April 8, Boca played awfully against Defensa y Justicia 2–1, nevertheless, Boca keeps leading the tournament. On April 11, Boca were held by Palmeiras to a 1–1 draw away from home, in the third match of Copa Libertadores group stage. Another bad match took Boca to the second consecutive loss, after the 1–0 defeat against Independiente. On April 22, Boca returned to the good game and managed to win 3–1 over Newell's Old Boys. On the fourth game of Copa Libertadores group stage, Boca lost 2–0 against Palmeiras.

May
The first match of May was a 1–1 draw against Junior in Colombia. In the last game in La Bombonera, Boca won 2–0 over Unión. Boca was crowned League champions after a 2–2 draw against Gimnasia y Esgrima (LP), defending their own title achieved last season, claiming their thirty-third domestic title. The last match of the League was a 3–3 draw against Huracán. The last match of the season was a 5–0 win over Alianza Lima, with this victory, Boca qualified for the Round of 16.

Current squad

Last updated on May 17, 2018

Transfers

In

Winter

Summer

Out

Winter

Summer

Pre-season and friendlies

Winter

Summer

Competitions

Overall

1: The final stages are played in the next season.

Primera División

League table

Relegation table

Results summary

Results by round

Matches

Copa Argentina

Round of 64

Round of 32

Round of 16

Supercopa Argentina

Copa Libertadores

Group stage

Team statistics

Season appearances and goals

Last updated on May 17, 2018

|-
! colspan="14" style="background:#00009B; color:gold; text-align:center"| Goalkeepers

|-
! colspan="14" style="background:#00009B; color:gold; text-align:center"| Defenders

|-
! colspan="14" style="background:#00009B; color:gold; text-align:center"| Midfielders

|-
! colspan="14" style="background:#00009B; color:gold; text-align:center"| Forwards

|-
! colspan="14" style="background:#00009B; color:gold; text-align:center"| Players transferred out during the season:

|}

Top scorers
Last updated on May 17, 2018

Clean sheets
Last updated on May 17, 2018

Disciplinary record
Last updated on May 17, 2018

References

External links
 Club Atlético Boca Juniors official web site 

Club Atlético Boca Juniors seasons
Boca Juniors